The Men's 100m T13 event for the 2012 Summer Paralympics took place at the London Olympic Stadium on 31 August and on 1 September.

Results

Heats

Heats took place on 31 August 2012. Jason Smyth broke his own world record in 10.54, while Jonathan Ntutu broke the African record.

Final

The final took place on 1 September 2012. Jason Smyth of Ireland won gold in a new world record time of 10.46. Luis Felipe Gutierrez took silver for his second medal of the  Games, with the South African Ntutu just clinching bronze.

References

Athletics at the 2012 Summer Paralympics
2012 in men's athletics